is a Japanese musician, singer, songwriter and composer under the Being label between years 2015-2019.

Biography

2015: The beginning of career
In his 4th year of elementary school he discovered his love for guitar. One year later, he started writing and composing songs by himself.

In 2012 he participated in an audition at Treasure Hunter ~Being 2012~ and won a special examination prize.

In December 2015 he made debut and released his first single, "All Categorize", which was used as the ending theme song for the anime television series Young Black Jack.

2016-2017: First One-Man Live
In April 2016, he released his second single, "Futari no Byoushin", which was used as the ending theme for the anime television series Detective Conan. With this song, he made his first TV appearance and performed on the Tokyo Broadcasting System Television music program Live B.

In July 2016 he held his first street-live performances, Real Life Capsule Vol.0 (リアルライブ・カプセルVol.0), in Shinjuku.

On 26 October 2016 Takuto released his first mini-album, Tokyo Chaos, which ranked #141 in its first week.

In November 2016 he continued with street-live performances Real Life Capsule Vol.1.

In January 2017 his new song "Yume Oi Hito" was used as the ending theme for the 4th season of anime television series Yamishibai.
On 8 February 2017 Takuto released his full first studio album Scape Goat (スケープゴート).

In September 2017, Takuto held with the singer Miyakawa-kun the two-man tour "Kamikaze Express". The title was planned to be released as a duet single in February 2018.

In November 2017 as part of celebration for his second debut singer anniversary, Takuto held a one-man acoustic live tour "Kaiki to Kaishi".

2018-2019: Duets with Miyakawa-kun
On 14 February 2018, Takuto released his first collaboration single "Kamikaze Express" with singer Miyakawakun. The song was used as an ending theme for the anime television series Detective Conan.

On 23 May 2019, Takuto released his second mini-album, Noroi ga Toketa Hi, which includes an album mix of a previously released collaboration single.

In July 2019, he released with Miyakawa-kun duet single under duet name Only this time Answer. After the appearance of Ongaku no Hi on the same month, the activities of Takuto has stopped.

Discography
Takuto has released three singles, one mini-album and one studio album.

Singles

Studio albums

EPs

Live performances
November 2015: Mitsubachi Fes 2015 in Tokyo
May 2016: FM802 Funky Market
June 2016: Sakae Sp-ring 2016
July 2016: Real Life Capsule Vol.0
October 2016: Minami Wheel 2016
November 2016: Real Life Capsule Vol.1
December 2016: Acoustic Live "Scapegoat"
February–March 2017: Real Life Capsule Vol.2
September 2017: Two Man Tour (with Miyakawa-kun) "Kamikaze Express"
November 2017: One-man acoustic live "Kaiki to Kaishi"

Anime soundtrack music
"All Categorize" - ending theme for the anime television series Young Black Jack
"Futari Byoushin" - ending theme for the anime television series Detective Conan
"Yume Oi Hito" - ending theme for the 4th season of anime television series Yamishibai
"Kamikaze Express" - ending theme for the anime television series Detective Conan
"Answer" - opening theme for the anime television series Detective Conan

References

External links

1997 births
Living people
Being Inc. artists
Japanese songwriters
Singers from Tokyo
21st-century Japanese singers
21st-century Japanese male singers